Philosophical Issues is an annual supplement to the journal Noûs published periodically, usually once per year. Each issue explores a specific area of philosophy through invited papers, critical studies, and book symposia. 

Philosophical Issues was published by Ridgeview Publishing Company for the first nine volumes. It became a supplement to Noûs in 2000, and is currently published by Wiley-Blackwell.

See also
 List of philosophy journals

References

Philosophy journals
Wiley-Blackwell academic journals
English-language journals
Publications established in 1991
Annual journals